Larry Pitchford (born April 29, 1936), better known by his ring name Beauregarde, is an American former professional wrestler and musician.

Professional wrestling career 
Pitchford's wrestling career began in 1963, touring the Philippines as "Eric the Golden Boy". Given the name Beauregarde by fellow wrestler Ripper Collins, he next debuted as a heel in Hawaii before returning to Portland. By 1970, he had become one of the biggest names on the NWA's Pacific Northwest Wrestling circuit, and won the NWA Pacific Northwest Tag Team Championship in 1968 (teamed with Lonnie Mayne), 1969 (with Roger Kirby), 1970 (with The Claw) and 1971 (with Dutch Savage).

Beauregarde was renowned for his unique wrestling moves (and finishing move "The Thumb") and crazy characters he created for himself. On match days, he would find a historic figure whose date of birth fell on that day and pretend to be them during the match and in interviews.

In 1971, he released an album bearing his stage name, Beauregarde, featuring Greg Sage of Wipers on guitar. Beauregarde enlisted Sage (then 17) after overhearing him playing guitar for a friend's band at Sound Productions studio in Portland in 1969.

In 1973, he managed the tag team of Brute Bernard and Jay York in Jim Crockett's Mid Atlantic Championship Wrestling promotion.

After retiring from wrestling in 1979, he bought a sheet-rock company in Florida where he lived and spent most of his time fishing.

On February 4, 2006, Beauregarde made his first wrestling-related appearance in many years at Hardkore Championship Wrestling's Incredible 8 Tournament in South Florida, where he was one of the first "HCW Honorable Contribution to Wrestling Award" recipients along with wrestlers Rusty Brooks, Stephen "Big Daddy" DiBlasio and "Outlaw" JR James.

Championships and accomplishments 
Pacific Northwest Wrestling
 NWA Pacific Northwest Tag Team Championship (5 time) - with Dutch Savage (1 time), Lonnie Mayne (2 times), Roger Kirby (1 time), and The Claw (1 time)

References

External links 
 

1936 births
20th-century professional wrestlers
American male professional wrestlers
Living people
Sportspeople from Portland, Oregon
Professional wrestlers from Oregon